Joel Huertas Cornudella (born 9 May 1995) is a Spanish professional footballer who plays for CF Igualada as a midfielder.

Club career
Born in Juneda, Lleida, Catalonia, Huertas joined La Masia in summer 2011, from Lleida Esportiu. Ahead of the 2014–15 season, he was promoted to the reserves and was loaned out to CF Badalona on 25 August 2014.

On 20 August 2015, Huertas joined Lleida Esportiu on loan for the upcoming season along with his teammate Agostinho Cá. On 18 July 2016, he signed permanently for the club on a two-year contract.

On 17 January 2019, Huertas moved abroad and joined Polish I liga club Wigry Suwałki on a one and a half year deal.

On 8 October 2020 he returned to Spain and signed with CF Igualada.

Honours
Barcelona
UEFA Youth League: 2013–14

References

External links

1995 births
Living people
Association football midfielders
Spanish footballers
Segunda División B players
Tercera División players
FC Barcelona Atlètic players
CF Badalona players
Lleida Esportiu footballers
I liga players
Wigry Suwałki players
Spanish expatriate footballers
Expatriate footballers in Poland
Spanish expatriates in Poland